The 2010 European Wushu Championships were the 13th edition of the European Wushu Championships for adults and juniors, and were held at Dilek Sabancı Sport Hall in Antalya, Turkey between March 6–13, 2010. A total of 394 athletes from 28 countries participated at the championships.

Competitions
Awards were given for seven events as following:
International Wushu Federation
Taolu Competition Adults
Sanda Competition Adults
Taolu Competition Juniors (Category A)
Taolu Competition Cadets (Category B)
Taolu Competition Children (Category C)
European Wushu Federation
Sanda Competition Juniors age 17–18
Sanda Competition Juniors age 15–16

Nations

 (19)
 (7)
 (17)
 (4)
 (13)
 (1)
 (3)
 (3)
 (12)
 (7)
 (7)
 (13)
 (6)
 (2)
 (8)
 (17)
 (6)
 (10)
 (3)
 (16)
 (3)
 (29)
 (57)
 (9)
 (8)
 (11)
 (65)
 (38)

Medal table

Overall

Medal summary (Adults)

Men's taolu

Men's sanshou

Women's taolu

Women's sanshou

References

Wushu
Wushu in Turkey
Sport in Antalya
21st century in Antalya
European Wushu Championships
European Wushu Championships
2010 in wushu (sport)